The 37th Curtis Cup Match was played from 8 to 10 June 2012 at Nairn Golf Club in Nairn, Scotland. Great Britain and Ireland won 10 to 9.

Format
The contest was a three-day competition, with three foursomes and three fourball matches on each of the first two days, and eight singles matches on the final day, a total of 20 points.

Each of the 20 matches is worth one point in the larger team competition. If a match is all square after the 18th hole extra holes are not played. Rather, each side earns  a point toward their team total. The team that accumulates at least 10 points wins the competition. In the event of a tie, the current holder retains the Cup.

Teams
Eight players for the Great Britain & Ireland and USA participated in the event plus one non-playing captain for each team.

The Great Britain & Ireland team was selected by the Selection Panel of the LGU in March 2012.

Five of the American team were selected in December 2011 (Anderson, Duncan, Ernst, Lua and Pancake). The remaining three members of the team (McCloskey, Popson and Tubert) were announced in January 2012.

Friday's matches

Morning foursomes

Afternoon fourballs

Saturday's matches

Morning foursomes

Afternoon fourballs

Sunday's singles matches

References

External links
USGA archive
2012 Curtis Cup (about.sports)

Curtis Cup
Golf tournaments in Scotland
International sports competitions hosted by Scotland
Sport in Highland (council area)
Curtis Cup
Curtis Cup
Curtis Cup